Charles Edwin Odegaard (January 10, 1911 – November 14, 1999) was the president of the University of Washington from 1958–1973. Odegaard is credited in transforming the University of Washington from an average state university to one among the top public universities in the United States.

Background
Odegaard was born in 1911 in Chicago Heights, Illinois to Charles Alfred and Mary Cord Odegaard. His maternal grandparents emigrated from Norway in 1880. The son of the president of a machine tools company, Odegaard grew up on the north side of Chicago. While neither parent had finished high school, they encouraged Odegaard's scholastic study and had an extensive library. In his autobiography, he says this family environment "preconditioned me for history as a discipline". Odegaard graduated from Dartmouth College in 1932 and received his Master's degree and Ph.D from Harvard University in 1933 and 1937, respectively.

Career
Odegaard taught history at the University of Illinois at Urbana-Champaign, and then took a leave of absence to serve in the Navy during World War II, earning the rank of lieutenant commander. Odegaard returned to academia, first teaching at the University of Illinois, then becoming the Executive Director of the American Council Of Learned Societies.  In 1953 he became the Dean of Arts and Sciences at the University of Michigan.

In 1958, Odegaard accepted the presidency of the University of Washington and quickly made changes to remedy perceived complacency in the university's administration. Six years after Odegaard arrived, only three of the original fifteen deans remained.  The university witnessed tremendous growth during Odegaard's tenure with the student population growing from 16,000 to 34,000, 35 new buildings (doubling the square footage of the university), increased investment in the medical school, instituted a vision of building a "community of scholars", and oversaw the growth of the operating budget from $37 million USD in 1958 to over $400 million USD in 1973.

Personal life
In 1941 he married Elizabeth Jane Ketchum  (1908-1980) in Chicago at the University of Chicago Chapel.  Elizabeth Ketchum was the daughter of Milo Smith Ketchum, former Dean of the College of Engineering at Colorado, Pennsylvania, and Illinois, and Mary Esther Beatty Ketchum, who taught at the University of Illinois.  Charles and Elizabeth Odegaard had one daughter, Mary Ann Odegaard. Odegaard died in his sleep of heart failure in 1999 at the age of 88, after several years of failing health.

Legacy

Odegaard Undergraduate Library, the undergraduate library at the University of Washington is named in his honor.
The Charles E. Odegaard Award was established at the University of Washington on behalf of diversity at the university.
Blake Island Marine State Park has a plaque dedicating the island to him, despite the islands history.

References

Bibliography

Archives
Lauren R. Donaldson papers. 1906-1994. 29 cubic feet (42 boxes). At the University of Washington Libraries Special Collections.
 Charles M. Gates papers. 1881-1963. 24.84 cubic feet.  At the University of Washington Libraries Special Collections.

External links
Odegaard Undergraduate Library 
The Extracurricular Clout of Power College Presidents. Time magazine, November 5, 1965
Iron Man at Washington. Time magazine, November 17, 1958
The Black Student Union at UW: Black Power on Campus, Seattle Civil Rights and Labor History Project, focuses on the 1968 sit-in of Odegaard's office that led to major changes in diversity policy at the University of Washington.

1911 births
1999 deaths
Dartmouth College alumni
Harvard University alumni
University of Michigan faculty
University of Illinois Urbana-Champaign faculty
Presidents of the University of Washington
American people of Norwegian descent
Educators from Seattle
20th-century American academics